Kugan a/l Dhevarajan (born 11 January 1997) is a Malaysian footballer who plays as a midfielder for Petaling Jaya City in the Malaysia Super League.

Club career

Early year

Born in Selangor, Kugan joined Selangor's youth system as a 16-year-old, and continued climbing through the ranks until reaching Selangor under-21 squad in 2015.

Selangor

Kugan made his way through the youth and reserve teams and was a key member of Omar Ali's Under-21 team. In addition to winning his first President Cup medal with Selangor under-21 on 2017, he also finished the season with 23 appearances and scoring four goals. 

On 27 November 2017, Selangor under-21 manager, Ariffin Ab Hamid confirmed that Kugan would be definitely promoted to Selangor's first team for 2018 season.

Career statistics

Club

1 Includes Malaysia FA Cup matches.
2 Includes Malaysia Cup matches.

Honours

Club
Selangor
 President Cup (1): 2017

References

External links
 Profile at faselangor.my

1997 births
Living people
Malaysian footballers
Selangor FA players
Malaysia Super League players
Malaysian people of Malay descent
People from Selangor
Association football wingers
Association football midfielders